Conasprella lizarum is a species of sea snail, a marine gastropod mollusk in the family Conidae, the cone snails and their allies.

Like all species within the genus Conasprella, these cone snails are predatory and venomous. They are capable of "stinging" humans, therefore live ones should be handled carefully or not at all.

Description
The size of the shell varies between 20 mm and 36 mm.

Distribution
This species occurs in the Indian Ocean off Somalia.

References

 Tucker J.K. & Tenorio M.J. (2009) Systematic classification of Recent and fossil conoidean gastropods. Hackenheim: Conchbooks. 296 pp.
  Puillandre N., Duda T.F., Meyer C., Olivera B.M. & Bouchet P. (2015). One, four or 100 genera? A new classification of the cone snails. Journal of Molluscan Studies. 81: 1–23.

External links
 The Conus Biodiversity website
 

Endemic fauna of Somalia
lizarum
Gastropods described in 1992